Encephalartos brevifoliolatus, the escarpment cycad, is a cycad in the African genus Encephalartos. It is extinct in the wild. The escarpment cycad is an African plant that was found in South Africa's short grasslands in the very open Protea savanna. These plants are used to growing on large cliffs.

Description
This plant has an erect or decombent stem, with a diameter of 25-30 cm and a height of 2.5 meters.

The leaves, pinnate, irregularly twisted on themselves and 80-120 cm long, are composed of numerous pairs of lanceolate leaflets, with a leathery consistency, arranged on the rachis in the opposite way, with an angle of 45°. The base of the petiole is tomentose on the dorsal and glabrous side on the ventral side.

It is a dioecious species, of which only male specimens have been described in nature. Their cones, from 1 to 6, erect, pedunculated, coarsely cylindrical, are about 30 cm long and 6–7 cm in diameter.

References

External links

https://web.archive.org/web/20120224094412/http://www.cycadsociety.org/brevifoliolatus/brevifoliolatus.html

brevifoliolatus
Endemic flora of South Africa
Trees of South Africa
Extinct biota of Africa
Plants extinct in the wild
Critically endangered flora of Africa